Space age pop is a subgenre of pop and easy listening music associated with Mexican and American composers and songwriters in the Space Age of the 1950s and 1960s. Also known as bachelor pad music or lounge music, it was inspired by the spirit of those times, an optimism based on the strong post-war economy and technology boom, and excitement about humanity's early forays into space. Although there is no exact album, date, or year when the genre was born, producer Irwin Chusid identifies its heyday as "roughly 1954 to 1963—from the dawn of high-fidelity (hi-fi) to the arrival of the Beatles."

The music is not limited to a single style, and it is not always easily categorized. There are several styles that can be recognized as an influence: classical composers like Ravel and Debussy; the big bands of the 1940s; and different exotic styles, such as samba, Latin, and Calypso music. It is also related to its genres of lounge music, exotica, or beautiful music/easy listening, and may be regarded as a precursor to the musical genre of space music. Albums often have album covers related to science fiction—those include rockets, moonscapes, or modernism.

Genre and style
Space age pop brought innovation to popular music in several ways—these albums in the early 1950s attend to include some of the earliest examples of concept albums, and embraced the earliest form of four-track recordings introduced in 1957.

References

External links
The space age pop-music page
Gallery of space age pop album covers

1950s introductions
20th-century music genres
Pop music genres
Easy listening music
Space Age
American styles of music
Mexican styles of music